Remmers is a surname. Notable people with the surname include:

 Ingrid Remmers (1965–2021), German politician
 Jan Remmers (1922–2013), Dutch footballer and coach
 Mike Remmers (born 1989), American football player

See also
 Remmer
 Remmert